Khovu-Aksy (Xovu-Aksı) is a rural locality (a selo) and the administrative center of Chedi-Kholsky District of Tuva, Russia. Population: 

The cobalt and nickel ore deposit at Khovu-Aksy is the type locality of five minerals: argentopentlandite,  lazarenkoite, shubnikovite, smolyaninovite, and vladimirite.

References

Notes

Sources

Rural localities in Tuva
Geological type localities